Tang Chih-chun (Chinese: 湯智鈞, pinyin: Tāng Zhìjūn; born 16 March 2001) is a Taiwanese archer competing in men's recurve events. He won the gold medal in the men's team recurve event, alongside Luo Wei-min and Wei Chun-heng, at the 2018 Asian Games held in Jakarta, Indonesia.

In 2018, he competed at the Summer Youth Olympics held in Buenos Aires, Argentina without winning a medal. In the boys' singles he reached the elimination rounds where he was eliminated in his second elimination match, by Trenton Cowles of the United States. Cowles went on to win the gold medal. In the mixed team he reached the bronze medal match, alongside Rebecca Jones of New Zealand, and they lost their match against Quinn Reddig of Namibia and Trenton Cowles.

In 2019, Tang and Wei Chun-heng won the silver medal in the men's team event at the Summer Universiade held in Naples, Italy.

In 2021, he represented Chinese Taipei at the 2020 Summer Olympics in Tokyo, Japan, winning the silver medal in the Men's Team event, while barely missing a medal due to placing fourth in the Men's individual event.

References

External links 
 

Living people
2001 births
Place of birth missing (living people)
Taiwanese male archers
Asian Games medalists in archery
Asian Games gold medalists for Chinese Taipei
Archers at the 2018 Asian Games
Medalists at the 2018 Asian Games
Archers at the 2018 Summer Youth Olympics
Universiade medalists in archery
Universiade silver medalists for Chinese Taipei
Medalists at the 2019 Summer Universiade
Olympic archers of Taiwan
Archers at the 2020 Summer Olympics
Medalists at the 2020 Summer Olympics
Olympic medalists in archery
Olympic silver medalists for Taiwan
21st-century Taiwanese people